The Harbor - Gold League is a high school athletic league that is part of the CIF Southern Section. The league does not support football.

Schools
 Price High School
 Renaissance Academy
 Firebaugh High School
 Ribet Academy	
 San Gabriel Academy

References

CIF Southern Section leagues